The Cloncurry River is situated in the Gulf Country of north west Queensland, Australia.

Geography 

The headwaters of the river rise west of Mount Boorama near Mount Tracey in the Selwyn Range and initially flows north west then turns north travelling more or less parallel with the Cloncurry-Dajarra road before crossing the Flinders Highway near the town of Cloncurry. The river continues north westward flowing under Mount Marathon past Fort Constantine and crossing the Wills Developmental Road. Continuing northward the river is a series of braided channel running parallel with the Burke Developmental Road across the mostly uninhabited plains with many tributaries entering then across Simpson Plain before discharging into the Flinders River of which it is a tributary near Wondoola in Stokes.

The riverbed is composed of Silt with clay and sand, sand and gravel and gravel with cobble.

History 
Kalkatunga (also known as Kalkadoon, Kalkadunga, Kalkatungu) is an Australian Aboriginal language. The Kalkatunga language region is North-West Queensland including the local government areas of the City of Mount Isa.

The river was named by the explorer Robert O'Hara Burke on New Years Day 1861 during his disastrous expedition after a friend from Ireland, Lady Cloncurry.

A gauging station was installed at Cloncurry to measure flow rates and river heights in 1969.

See also

List of rivers of Australia

References

Rivers of Queensland
North West Queensland